The 11th Infantry Division (11. Infanterie-Division) was a formation of Nazi Germany's Wehrmacht during World War II. Formed 1 October 1934 as Infanterieführer I in Allenstein it was renamed 11. Infanterie-Division on 15. October 1935 with the disclosure of German rearmament.

About two-thirds of the division could be evacuated to Schleswig-Holstein from the Courland pocket on 30 April 1945. Commander Feyerabend and the rest of the division went into Russian captivity.

Commanders
Generalleutnant Günther von Niebelschütz: 1 October 1934 – 1 April 1937
Generalleutnant Max Bock: 1 April 1937 – 23 October 1939
Generalleutnant Herbert von Böckmann: 23 October 1939 – 26 January 1942
Generalleutnant Siegfried Thomaschki: 26 January 1942 – 7 September 1943
Generalleutnant Karl Burdach: 7 September 1943 – 1 April 1944
Generalleutnant Hellmuth Reymann: 1 April 1944 – 18 November 1944
Generalmajor Gerhard Feyerabend: 18 November 1944 – 8 May 1945

Subordination and deployment

Literature
Burkhard Müller-Hillebrand: Das Heer 1933–1945. Entwicklung des organisatorischen Aufbaues. Vol.III: Der Zweifrontenkrieg. Das Heer vom Beginn des Feldzuges gegen die Sowjetunion bis zum Kriegsende. Mittler: Frankfurt am Main 1969, p. 285.
 Georg Tessin: Verbände und Truppen der deutschen Wehrmacht und Waffen-SS im Zweiten Weltkrieg, 1939 – 1945. Vol. III: Die Landstreitkräfte 6 – 14. Mittler: Frankfurt am Main 1967.

0*011
Military units and formations established in 1934
1934 establishments in Germany
Military units and formations disestablished in 1945